Itzel or Ixchel is the Mayan goddess of midwifery and medicine. It also may refer to:

Personal name

Given name
 Laura Itzel Castillo (born 1957), Mexican architect and politician
 Itzel Nayeli García Montaño (born 1995), Mexican criminal and a suspected spree killer
 Itzel González (born 1994), Mexican footballer
 Itzel Manjarrez (born 1990), Mexican taekwondo athlete
 Itzel Reza (born 1979), Mexican sprint canoer
 Itzel Ríos de la Mora (born 1978), Mexican politician

Surname
 Adam Itzel Jr. (1864–1893), American conductor and composer
 Jack Itzel (1924–1966), American footballer
 Sandra Itzel (born 1993), Mexican actress

See also
 Conasprella ixchel, a marine gastropod species
 Ixchela, a genus of spiders